Lucknow is the capital city of Uttar Pradesh, the most populous state of India.

Lucknow may also refer to:

Cities, towns, and villages
 Lucknow, a village in the Mayabunder tehsil on Andaman Island
 Lucknow, Angus, Scotland
 Lucknow, Victoria, Australia
 Lucknow, New South Wales, Australia
 Lucknow, Ontario, Canada
 Lucknow, Pennsylvania, USA
 Lucknow, South Carolina, an unincorporated community in Lee County, South Carolina, USA

Other places, buildings, etc.
 Lucknow, an estate now known as Castle in the Clouds in Moultonborough, New Hampshire, USA

See also  
Lucknawi